Hugo Daya (born 25 October 1963) is a Colombian former cyclist. He competed in the sprint event at the 1984 Summer Olympics.

References

External links
 

1963 births
Living people
Colombian male cyclists
Olympic cyclists of Colombia
Cyclists at the 1984 Summer Olympics
Place of birth missing (living people)